Jalazone is a Palestinian refugee camp in the Ramallah and al-Bireh Governorate, located  north of Ramallah and adjacent to the village of Jifna to the north, Deir Dibwan to the east, Bir Zeit to the west and the Beit El Israeli settlement to the southeast.

History

Jalazone was established in 1949 on 253 dunams of land, as a result of the Palestinian exodus following the 1948 Arab-Israeli War. Like all official West Bank refugee camps, the United Nations Relief and Works Agency (UNRWA) had leased the land from Jordan. Most of the plots were state owned before the lease, while the remainder belonged to landowners from various nearby towns. After the Oslo Agreements between the Palestinian National Authority (PNA) and Israel, Jalazone's administrative affairs were transferred to the PNA while security matters remained under Israeli control. UNRWA also provides services to the camp.

Demographics
According to the Palestinian Central Bureau of Statistics (PCBS), Jalazone had a population of approximately 8,700 inhabitants in 2006. The Office for the Coordination of Humanitarian Affairs (OCHA) estimated the total population to be 14,520 in 2007. The number of inhabitants before 1967 was 5,013. The gender ratio in 2007 was 51.3% male and 48.7% female. The average age of camp residents was 24.

The majority of the refugees were from Lydda and many other Arab villages in central Palestine. The camp is largely maintained by the UNRWA with funding by Saudi Arabia. According to UNRWA archives in 2005, the majority of the families in the camp are descendants of refugees originally from Bayt Nabala (643 families) the neighboring town of Lydda (373 families). According to OCHA statistics, refugees in Jalazone hail from a total of 36 villages, most located in central Palestine, and mainly from Bayt Nabala, Annaba, al-Muzayri'a, Innaba, and al-Khayriyya. Others came from northern towns and villages, particularly Tiberias, Haifa, Sabbarin, Umm az-Zinat as well as al-Dawayima in the south near Hebron.

References

External links
profile: jalazone camp, UNWRA
Jalazone and Jalazone Camp, articles from UNWRA
Welcome To al-Jalazoun R.C.
Al-Jalazun Camp (Fact Sheet), Applied Research Institute–Jerusalem, ARIJ
Al-Jalazun Camp Profile, ARIJ
Al-Jalazun Aerial photo, ARIJ

Populated places established in 1949
Palestinian refugee camps in the West Bank
Ramallah and al-Bireh Governorate